Javier Vargas is a Spanish blues guitarist. Born in Madrid to Argentine parents who had emigrated to Spain from Buenos Aires, he founded the Vargas Blues Band in 1991, the year they released their first recording, All Around Blues. Since 1992, he has recorded on the Dro-Atlantic (Warner Music Group, Spain) label. He regularly tours Europe and Spain with his band, also playing at the 30th Anniversary Montreux Jazz Festival.

Discography
 All Around Blues (1991)
 Madrid-Memphis (1992)
 Blues Latino (1994)
 Texas Tango (1995)
 Gipsy Boogie (1997)
 Feedback (1998)
 Bluestrology (1998) y (2000)
 Madrid-Chicago Live (1999)
 The Best of... Vargas Blues Band (2001)
 Last Night VBB (2002)
 Espíritu Celeste (Tributo al Rock Argentino) (2002)
 Chill Latin Blues (2003)
 El Alma (2003)
 Spanish Fly (2003)
 Love, Union, Peace (2004)
 Lost & Found (2007)
 Mojo Protection (2008)
 Flamenco Blues Experience (2008)
 Vargas Blues Band, Comes Alive with Friends (2009)
 Mojo Protection Revisited (2010)
 Vargas, Bogert & Appice (feat. Shortino) + Live Wire (BONUS CD) (2011)
 Vargas Blues Band & Company (2012)
 Heavy City Blues (2013)
 From the dark (2014)
 Hard Time Blues (2016)
 Cambalache & Bronca (2017)
 King of the Latin Blues (2018)
 [[Vargas & Jagger - Move On, feat. John Byron Jagger]] (2019)
 Del sur (2020)
 The Very Best of Vargas Blues Band'' (2020)

References

External links
 Vargas Blues Band (Official website) 
 Javier Vargas on Indyrock.es 
 Todomúsica: Vargas Blues Band 

Spanish guitarists
Spanish male guitarists
Musicians from Madrid
Living people
1958 births